National Democratic Alliance is an Indian political party coalition led by Bharatiya Janata Party.
For the 2009 Indian general election, the NDA's candidates for the Lok Sabha constituencies are as follows.

Seat Sharing Summary

Andhra Pradesh

Arunachal Pradesh

Assam

Bihar

Chhattisgarh

Goa

Gujarat

Haryana

Himachal Pradesh

Jammu and Kashmir

Jharkhand

Karnataka

Kerala

Madhya Pradesh

Maharashtra

Manipur

Meghalaya

Mizoram

Nagaland

Odisha

Punjab

Rajasthan

Sikkim

Tamil Nadu

Tripura

Uttar Pradesh

Uttarakhand

West Bengal

Constituencies by Union territory

Andaman and Nicobar Islands (1)

Chandigarh (1)

Dadra and Nagar Haveli (1)

Daman and Diu (1)

Lakshadweep (1)

NCT of Delhi (7)

Puducherry (1)

See also
 List of United Progressive Alliance candidates in the 2009 Indian general election
 List of National Democratic Alliance candidates in the 2019 Indian general election
 List of National Democratic Alliance candidates in the 2014 Indian general election

References

2009 Indian general election
Lists of Indian political candidates
National Democratic Alliance